Andriola is a surname. Notable people with the surname include:

Alfred Andriola (1912–1983), American cartoonist
Eleni Andriola (born 1986), Greek rhythmic gymnast